Valentyn Kostyantynovych Symonenko (born July 4, 1940, in Odesa) is a Ukrainian politician and former Soviet Communist Party functionary. Between 1996 and 2011 he was chairman of the Accounting Chamber of Ukraine.

In 1983-1992 he served as mayor of Odesa, then as the First Vice Prime Minister of Ukraine in the Fokin government, and for period of 10 days in October 1992 (October 2–12) ex officio acted as a Prime Minister of Ukraine upon the resignation of Vitold Fokin and the appointment of Leonid Kuchma to the office. Symonenko became the first "acting Prime Minister".

Symonenko has been elected to the Verkhovna Rada (parliament) for three sequential terms (11, 12(1), and 13(2) convocations).

In 1996 he was elected as the Chairman of the Accounting Chamber of Ukraine. In 2003 he was re-elected for the second 7-year term.  The Accounting Chamber executes control over revenues and expenditures of the State Budget of Ukraine on behalf of the Verkhovna Rada

External links
 Accounting Chamber of Ukraine - official site

See also
 Government of Ukraine
 Prime Minister of Ukraine

1940 births
Living people
Politicians from Odesa
Mayors of Odesa
Recipients of the title of Hero of Ukraine
Ukrainian mountain climbers
Soviet mountain climbers
Governors of Odesa Oblast
Acting prime ministers of Ukraine
First vice prime ministers of Ukraine
Eleventh convocation members of the Verkhovna Rada of the Ukrainian Soviet Socialist Republic
20th-century Ukrainian politicians
Laureates of the State Prize of Ukraine in Science and Technology